Abbott Drive is a roadway mostly in Omaha, Nebraska, United States, but passes briefly through Carter Lake, Iowa. It is the easternmost link in Omaha's Park and Boulevard System that connects the eastern edge of Creighton University and North Downtown Omaha  or NoDo to Carter Lake, Iowa, Eppley Airfield to John J Pershing Drive on the eastern end of Florence, Nebraska. Considered "Omaha's gateway", the drive includes a distinctive "string of pearls" lighting feature.

In Carter Lake, the  section is designated as Iowa Highway 165 (Iowa 165). That section of Abbott Drive is the shortest state highway in Iowa and second-shortest in the Iowa highway system overall. Iowa 165 is entirely within the town of Carter Lake and is the only Iowa highway west of the Missouri River.

Route description

Carter Lake, Iowa
Iowa 165 is the  section of Omaha's Abbott Drive which passes briefly through the enclave of Carter Lake, Iowa. The route is fully signed; complete with Iowa welcome and Adopt-a-Highway signs on both ends. Abbott Drive in Omaha is not a state highway, so it does not have any state line signage. Abbott Drive in both states is included in the Federal Highway Administration's National Highway System.

Omaha, Nebraska

Abbott Drive continues north as an unmarked divided boulevard north from Avenue G, which is the Iowa-Nebraska state line. It wraps around Carter Lake and borders Eppley Airfield. The Arthur C. Storz Expressway branches westward, and approximately  later the divided roadway ends. At North 9th Street the road becomes John J. Pershing Drive.

History
Abbott Drive was built in the 1950s, connecting the area of downtown Omaha where the Union Pacific Railroad Omaha Shops Facility is with Eppley Airfield in East Omaha. One of the Kountze descendants built businesses along the drive in the 1970s, including the Easy Parking Company, which was one of the first parking companies in the United States. It moved from its early offices at the Omaha Grain Exchange and built Abbott Drive at Locust Street near Eppley Airfield in 1974. The Freedom Park is located just off Abbott.

After Eppley Airfield was built in the river bottoms to the east of Carter Lake, the shortest route from downtown Omaha to the airport was Abbott Drive which was routed through Carter Lake. Carter Lake initially maintained its section as a municipal road.  In 1957, when plans were made to upgrade the airport to accommodate jet aircraft, the Iowa Department of Transportation took over the road.

In the late 1990s and early 2000s a redevelopment project situated Omaha's new Qwest Convention Center, now known as CHI Health Center Omaha, and the operational headquarters of the Gallup Organization along Abbott Drive. An extensive revitalization process led to the installation of the "string of pearls" lighting, along with other improvements. This was funded by the Peter Kiewit Foundation.

Major intersections

See also

Notes

References

External links

Transportation in Omaha, Nebraska
Streets in Omaha, Nebraska
Transportation in Pottawattamie County, Iowa
165